"Goblin Feet" is a poem written in 1915 by J. R. R. Tolkien for Edith Mary Bratt, his wife-to-be, which was published in Oxford poetry 1915 before being reprinted in anthologies such as The Book of Fairy Poetry (1920): it thus marks Tolkien's first appearance in the capacity of a writer for children.

His fiancée had expressed her liking for “spring and flowers and trees, and little elfin people”, and the poem with its rather twee references to “the tiny horns of enchanted leprechauns...their little happy feet”  reflects her preferences.  Tolkien himself would later wish that “the unhappy thing, representing all that I came (so soon after) to fervently dislike, could be buried for ever”.

Elven traditions
"Goblin Feet" reflects one strand in the twin elven traditions Tolkien inherited – the frivolous, small-scale, singing and dancing elves of the Edwardians, as opposed to the (medieval) warrior elves who would become the mainstream of his legendarium.

Despite his repudiation of Goblin Feet, similarly frivolous elves would re-appear in the Rivendell of The Hobbit with their ridiculous songs - “pretty fair nonsense I daresay you think it”.

Philology
Tolkien's use of words like 'flittermouse' for bat in the poem mark an important opening of his philological interests into his fairy world.

See also

J. R. R. Tolkien bibliography
Puck of Pook's Hill
Tuatha Dé Danann

References

External links 
 Goblin Feet

British poems
Middle-earth poetry
1915 poems